Glinzendorf is a town in the district of Gänserndorf in the Austrian state of Lower Austria.

Geography
Glinzendorf lies 10 km east of Vienna. Only about 0.83 percent of the municipality is forested.

References

Cities and towns in Gänserndorf District